Dark Nights: Metal is a 2017 - 2018 monthly crossover comic book storyline published by DC Comics, which consisted of a core eponymous miniseries, and a number of other tie-in books. Premiering in June 2017 and lasting until April 2018, the plot was written by Scott Snyder, with art by Greg Capullo, Jonathan Glapion and FCO Plascencia. The story closely links with Snyder and Capullo's run on Batman during The New 52 DC relaunch.

The story involves Batman discovering a Dark Multiverse that exists beneath the core DC multiverse. It is revealed that both multiverses are connected through mysterious metals that Batman has encountered over the years. His investigations eventually result in him releasing seven evil versions of himself from the Dark Multiverse, led by the dark god known as Barbatos, who plans to unleash darkness across every Earth.

A soundtrack featuring songs inspired by the graphic novel was released as exclusive vinyl picture disc on September 28, 2018. The six-track EP features heavy metal songs by Jerry Cantrell, Chino Moreno, Brann Dailor, Maria Brink, Alexis Krauss and Jason Aalon Butler.

Publication history 
DC Comics first announced the details of "Dark Nights: Metal" at Fan Expo Dallas in April 2017. The company revealed that the event would feature the reunion of Scott Snyder and Greg Capullo after their widely acclaimed New 52 Batman run. The series, which debuted in June 2017, is the culmination of their Batman story arcs, which includes The Court of Owls, Death of the Family, Zero Year, and Endgame. Snyder stated, "I've been writing Metal as long as I've been writing Batman."

The idea of creating a dark multiverse came from Snyder, who was inspired by watching the science documentary television series Cosmos: A Spacetime Odyssey with his five-year-old son. He became fascinated with the concept of dark matter, prompting him to question "What if the Multiverse essentially has these 52 universes, but has almost this ocean of possibility, this ocean of almost reactive matter beneath it that's like a Dark Multiverse". Aside the seven featured Dark Knights in the finished comic book, Snyder planned more dark Batmen that got ultimately cut; these included a Punisher-esque Batman, a dark magic-wielding Batman, a Batman who grew up as a patient in Arkham Asylum after being accused of his parents' murder, a Batman who merged with his whole rogues gallery and one who merged with Gotham City itself.

Dark Nights: Metal also marks the first appearance of Dream of the Endless from Neil Gaiman's The Sandman (1989–1996) in the post-New 52 DC Universe. According to Snyder, he wanted to make the story unforgettable and a character to help guide the superheroes through the unknown. When he realized Dream would be a good fit, he reached out to Gaiman for permission to use him. “I was so excited... [Gaiman] couldn’t have been more generous", he said. "It’s literally one of the best moments of my career, to be able to get to write a character that meant so much to me growing up and still does".

In June 2017, DC announced seven one-shot comics that tie into the story of "Dark Nights: Metal": Batman: The Red Death, Batman: The Murder Machine, Batman: The Dawnbreaker, Batman: The Drowned, Batman: The Merciless,  Batman: The Devastator, and The Batman Who Laughs. DC stated, "Each one-shot story spotlights a different, corrupted version of Batman spawned from the Dark Multiverse to wreak havoc on Earth."

The following month, DC announced Batman: Lost written by Scott Snyder with art by Olivier Coipel and Bengal. Snyder states, "the single issue story will strand Batman alone in the Dark Multiverse, where he will face his greatest fears."

At the 2017 Comic-Con International, an additional tie-in one-shot was announced called Hawkman Found written by Jeff Lemire with art by Bryan Hitch and Kevin Nowlan. As the title implies, it focused on the connection between Hawkman and the events of "Dark Nights: Metal" and it is positioned as a sequel to Batman Lost. Lemire revealed that it "re-positions one of DC’s oldest, most iconic and most confusing characters ahead of a possible new ongoing in the new year."

In September 2017, DC announced, without a specific reason, that issue #4 would be delayed by a week. This led to the one-shot comic, Hawkman Found, being delayed by a week as well.

DC announced another delay without reason in October 2017 and issue #5 was released three weeks later than the originally scheduled date.

The series' sequel, Dark Nights: Death Metal, by Snyder and Capullo, was announced for May 2020.

Synopsis

Prelude 
Hal Jordan is summoned by Ganthet to investigate a dark presence that he senses on Earth, the location of which is revealed to be the Batcave. Upon his arrival, he meets Duke Thomas. As they investigate, they stumble upon a hidden room in the Batcave, where they hear a mysterious voice that lures them in. This leads them to a cell where Batman has imprisoned the Joker.

Meanwhile, Batman has been investigating random frequencies that have appeared across the Earth, which he believes are a part of a bigger mystery that he has been investigating for years regarding mysterious metals and dark energy. He enlists the help of Mister Terrific to collect more data from Earth-Two. After conferring with him, he realizes that he needs to use the Anti-Monitor tower at Superman's Fortress of Solitude to further his investigations.

Batman continues his investigation by seeking Hephaestus, the Greek god of blacksmiths, in Athens, but learns from Wonder Woman that the Greek Gods have abandoned Earth. However, she has been given a weapon forged for Apollo called the Sunblade that she has been instructed to give to Batman. This leads him to an encounter with Talia al Ghul, where he is able to trade the Sunblade for a dagger forged by the wizard Shazam. It is made of one of the metals Batman has been searching for.

Back in the Batcave, the Joker has escaped his cell and appears to have deeper knowledge of the unraveling mystery. He proceeds to smash a machine that Batman has built, claiming that it will herald the end of the world. A fight ensues, where it is revealed that Duke is a metahuman with the power to become luminescent and see light constructs of his surroundings. It ends when the Joker suddenly disappears. Batman returns and explains that he needed the machine to peer into the source of visions he had been seeing from the Dark Multiverse. Duke is able to use his newfound ability to see a blueprint of the machine. Hal gives him his power ring, so that he is able to reconstruct it. This ends with Batman receiving a vision of complete darkness, while a group of dark figures exclaim that the seal has been broken and that the Dark Knights are coming, implying that Batman opened up a door to the Dark Multiverse.

Plot 
The story is framed around the journals of Carter Hall, who reveals a mystery that spans centuries revolving around divine metals that have landed on Earth. He gradually reveals a conflict that has existed since the beginning of time between four tribes: the wolf, the bear, the bird and the bat.

After the Justice League defeats Mongul on his war moon, they return home to find Challengers Mountain, the headquarters of the superhero team the Challengers of the Unknown, has mysteriously appeared in the middle of Gotham City. When they get into the mountain they are met by Kendra Saunders, otherwise known as Hawkgirl, who warns them of a full-scale invasion. She explains the concept of a Dark Multiverse, a multiverse that exists beneath the DC Multiverse, that contains a dark beast named Barbatos. Through her investigations, she has discovered a connection between Barbatos and the Wayne family. Batman is revealed to be part of a prophecy in which he will be treated by five divine metals that will open a door to the Dark Multiverse and allow Barbatos to invade the Multiverse. It is further revealed that Barbatos first marked Batman when he was sent back in time by Darkseid's Omega Beams during the events of the Final Crisis storyline. Despite this, Batman steals Kendra's sample of Nth metal, one of the divine metals. In bringing it to the Batcave to study it, the metal leads Batman to the journal of Carter Hall, discovered to have been in Wayne Manor the whole time. The journal confirms Batman's suspicions regarding his role in the prophecy. He is then visited by Daniel Hall (Dream) who warns him that the "nightmare has only just begun."

The whole Justice League searches for Batman and, when Superman finds him, he interrogates him. During this exchange, Batman reveals that he has already been exposed to the foretold divine metals in a process called mantling. It started when he faced the Court of Owls and was exposed to electrum. He was exposed to dionesium during the events of the Endgame story arc, when he fought to the death with the Joker. The machine that was subsequently used to resurrect him exposed him to promethium. Finally, when he used the machine that allowed him to peer into the Dark Multiverse (during the events of the lead-up), he exposed himself to the Nth metal. In an attempt to escape the last metal, Batman steals Darkseid, who has been reduced to a baby. He aims to use Darkseid's Omega Beams to go back in time again and prevent Barbatos from meeting him. Unfortunately, he is tricked by the Court of Owls and subsequently exposed to the last divine metal: batmanium. This causes him to exchange places with Barbatos and seven dark versions of himself from the Dark Multiverse.

Superman flies to the Fortress of Solitude where he encounters the dark versions of Batman for the first time as they introduce themselves as the Dark Knights. They all come from the Dark Multiverse — temporary negative realities created by the fears of people from their respective counterpart positive universes — and were recruited by Barbatos with the promise of preventing the end of their worlds. The Batman Who Laughs from Earth-22, who lost his sanity due to his world's Joker, gathered the six other Dark Multiverse Batmen after they each alter themselves to gain superhuman abilities. The Dark Knights' membership includes the speedster fusion of Flash and Batman called The Red Death, a female amphibious Batman (Bryce Wayne) called The Drowned, a corrupted, teenaged Green Lantern Batman named The Dawnbreaker, a cyborg Batman named The Murder Machine, a Batman known as The Merciless who wears the helmet of Ares and the Doomsday-infected Batman called The Devastator. Superman is overwhelmed as he is spirited away from danger by the Flash and Doctor Fate.

Superman meets the people who are left of the resistance, including those who are connected to the Nth metal such as Doctor Fate, Steel, and Plastic Man's egg. Nightwing explains how major cities around the world have fallen to the dark versions of Batman: The Red Death attacked Central City, The Drowned attacked Amnesty Bay, The Dawnbreaker attacked Coast City, The Murder Machine attacked Detroit, The Merciless attacked Langley, The Devastator attacked Metropolis and The Batman Who Laughs takes Gotham City. Suddenly, Mister Terrific interprets vibrations coming from Plastic Man's egg which indicate the coordinates of four locations that need to be investigated. Wonder Woman, Doctor Fate and Kendra Saunders go to investigate the Rock of Eternity. Green Lantern and Mister Terrific head to the remains of Thanagar. Aquaman and Deathstroke go to Atlantis. Finally, Superman has Steel and the Flash create a path into the Dark Multiverse for him through the Phantom Zone. Once he arrives, Superman realizes that it was a trap set by the Dark Knights so that they can harness the energy from his cells to power their doomsday device which would unleash their reality into the Multiverse.

While searching for the Nth Metal at the Rock of Eternity, Wonder Woman, Doctor Fate and Kendra Saunders face the personification of the Seven Sins. Kendra, entrusted with the mission given by the Council of Immortals, tries to fire the Anti-Monitor's astral brain into the center of the Multiverse as an attempt to stop the Dark Multiverse but is interrupted by Barbatos, who transforms her into a dark-hawk version of herself named Lady Blackhawk. Meanwhile, Dr. Fate is confronted by Black Adam, who alongside Vandal Savage, have brokered a deal with Barbatos. At the outskirts of Atlantis, Aquaman and Deathstroke enter the sacred/forbidden burial ground of Atlantis' first king, Arion. Meanwhile, Hal Jordan and Mr. Terrific reach Thanagar Prime where they find long-time Thangarian enemy Onimar Synn has conquered the planet with the help of JLA villain Starro. They have known of the Dark Multiverse's existence for eons and have prepared to “raze the Earth” with a doomsday device called The Phoenix Cannon. Starro neutralizes Lantern and Terrific and the two are incarcerated.

Meanwhile, in the Dark Multiverse, Superman wakes Bruce from an unending nightmare. Overwhelmed by Dark Supermen, the World's Finest are saved by Daniel Hall. Taken to Lucien's library in the Dreaming, Daniel proceeds to explain the history of the Multiverse, revealing that alongside the Monitor and the Anti-Monitor, there is a third being: a "Forger" tasked to watch over what had yet to come. Within the Dark Multiverse is a "World Forge" which hammered out universes from the hopes and fears of all living beings (the most stable forming the Orrery of Worlds). Barbatos himself is a great dragon that the Forger kept to destroy unstable worlds. Knowing only destruction, Barbatos killed his creator and the Forge began to darken (as twisted worlds survived). Convinced that there is still hope, Superman and Batman head for the Forge of Worlds; however, they find the Forge has gone dark and are confronted by the Dragon of Barbatos — a corrupted Carter Hall. Superman and Batman evade Carter Hall's attack as they struggle to search for a spark in the darkened core of the Forge.

Exiting a portal in Arion's grave, Arthur and Deathstroke find themselves in the Earth's core. Remembering a legend of how Arion saved Atlantis by using magic from the Earth's core, they begin extracting Nth Metal only to come under attack from Black Manta, who is allied with the Dark Knights.

On Thanagar Prime, Hal and Mr. Terrific are rescued from their cells by the Martian Manhunter (who has been exploring Thanagar Prime to learn about the secret Nth Metal deposits) and the trio proceed to rescue Plastic Man from Synn and Starro. They soon learn several Dark Knights have seized control of the Phoenix Cannon, reversing its polarity to make Earth sink further into the Dark Multiverse.

In the Rock of Eternity, Kendra regains control of her body after Wonder Woman uses her golden lasso on her, restoring Kendra's memories, although she is still in her dark-hawk form. Kendra decides to operate under her original alias, Hawkgirl, and arms herself with Carter's mace. However, even after defeating Black Adam, both are beaten by The Batman Who Laughs, who explains that all the heroes have done is help accelerate Barbatos' plans and that Earth is now low enough for Barbatos' army to claim it. Refusing to give up, Diana and Kendra proceed to use the Rock of Eternity's core to reach Barbatos and are confronted by his Dark Army.

Clashing their metals together (Diana's bracelets and Kendra's mace), the two heroines succeed in helping Green Lantern, Mr. Terrific, Aquaman and Deathstroke fight back against the Dark Knights. Mr. Terrific convinces Plastic Man to awaken, turning the tide of battle. Reaching the Dark Forge, Kendra manages to break Carter out of Barbatos' corruption (reigniting the Forge in the process), Diana reaches Batman and Superman (donned in Tenth Metal, the prime constitute of the World Forge), and Barbatos is confronted by the Flash and Cyborg, who have gathered reinforcements from other realities (including the '53rd Earth').

Refusing to lose, Barbatos reveals his last resort; using the combined power of the positive energy of his prisoner the Over-Monitor, the Anti-Monitor's brain's negative energy, and the Batman Who Laughs' dark energy, he plans to destroy all of creation and leave nothing but darkness in his wake. An unexpected team-up of Batman and the Joker, however, halts this plan, the Justice League defeats the remaining Dark Knights, and Hawkgirl subdues Barbatos. After the Over-Monitor explains that all living things have trace amounts of Tenth Metal, the League proceed to use this power to pull Earth out of the Dark Multiverse (which unintentionally also results in the Source Wall shattering). After the battle the Over-Monitor chains Barbatos down at the bottom of the Dark Multiverse with Tenth Metal chains, forcing him to watch the World Forge burn bright once more as it creates new worlds.

Epilogue 
The Justice League, with the inclusion of the Martian Manhunter and Hawkgirl, are invited to a gala dinner at Wayne Manor. They speak of their victory against Barbatos, Hawkman recovering on Blackhawk Island and having written about mysterious glimpses of what is to come. Most importantly, they address cracking the Source Wall, which means their Multiverse just got much bigger. This is a matter of utmost importance, but for the night the League decides to enjoy themselves and start preparing the next day.

During the after-dinner party, Bruce, Diana, and Clark talk more about the possible incoming threats now that the Multiverse has been expanded, including a hidden threat they have not yet told anyone else about. Bruce tells his friends not to worry, as he has a plan. On the desk of his study lay a number of blueprints for a Hall of Justice.

Aftermath 
During the event, portals were created over Gotham City which Derek James fell into and gained the abilities of trans-dimensional travel.

Titles involved

Reception 

The review aggregator website Comic Book Roundup, gave issue #1 an average score of 8.8 out of 10 based on 46 critics. Kieran Shiach of Comic Book Resources (CBR) wrote "Ultimately, Dark Nights: Metal is just outright fun. Snyder, Capullo and their collaborators really leaned into the ecstatic lunacy of superhero comics towards the end of their Batman run and Metal feels like the next logical step." Jesse Schedeen from IGN gave the issue an 8.4 out of 10 writing, "Apart from a surprisingly sluggish middle act, Dark Nights: Metal #1 is a terrifically enjoyable read. This issue crams in all the adventure and bombast that was promised, but also makes it clear that Batman is confronting one of the most dire and all-encompassing threats of his career." Pierce Lydon from Newsarama gave it an 8 out of 10 saying, "Dark Nights: Metal is a great event book because it is true to its characters and it’s deeper than just its surface “Justice League vs. Evil Batmen” premise."

Comic Book Roundup gave issue #2 an average score of 8.8 out of 10 based on 37 critics. Jim Johnson of CBR praised the issue, and the story-line, for giving Batman a larger role in the DC Universe, saying "Dark Nights: Metal, though, has so far not only given his character fantastically plausible reasons to get out of Gotham, but to take a central role in a storyline that reaches much farther." Schedeen gave it an 8.5 saying "While Metal still has a few kinks to iron out before it can rival the best of Snyder and Capullo's work, the series is delivering plenty of drama and spectacle as it explores the collision between the DCU and the Dark Multiverse."

Comic Book Roundup gave issue #3 an average score of 8.2 out of 10 based on 30 critics. Jim Johnson of CBR applauds the issue for providing Superman as a bright contrast from Batman, he says "The presence of Superman dilutes the darkness, if only a little, and is exemplified here in his optimistic, albeit false for now, hopes of finding and rescuing his crimefighting partner." Schedeen gave it a 7.2 saying "Unfortunately, this issue seems prone to biting off more than it can chew, resorting in a number of exposition-driven sequences that slow down an otherwise exciting storyline."

Soundtrack
DC and Warner Bros. collaborated on a soundtrack featuring songs inspired by Dark Nights: Metal. The soundtrack was produced by Tyler Bates and Mike Elizondo, and was released as a six-track EP exclusively on 12" vinyl on September 28, 2018. The pressing was limited to 4,000 copies and the EP was also accompanied by a poster and a 32-page comic book.

Track listing
Side A

Side B

Collected editions

Follow-up lines
With the end of Dark Nights: Metal, new titles were spun out due to the aftermath:

 New Justice: An aftermath for several DC Universe mainline comics.
 The New Age of DC Heroes: Debuting new characters and stories related to the repercussions of Dark Nights: Metal.
 The Sandman Universe: Featuring the return of several characters from The Sandman by Neil Gaiman.
 Year of the Villain: In March 2019, Scott Snyder announced a new event campaign titled Year of the Villain, which features the repercussions of Dark Nights: Metal from the supervillains' perspective.
 Tales from the Dark Multiverse: A series of one-off comics that take some of DC's most famous events and put a tragic twist on them, with Batman: Knightfall and The Death of Superman to start. DC Comics has teased other tales such as Teen Titans: The Judas Contract, Infinite Crisis, and Blackest Night.
 Dark Nights: Death Metal is the sequel to Dark Nights: Metal, with Snyder stating: "Everything is coming back, we want to pay it forward. The Omega Titans, Barbatos, the Forge, it’s all coming back. Everything you read, our goal is to reward. All of it culminates in like a year in like a Metal event."

References

External links 
 Official website

Batman titles
DC Comics titles
Comic book reboots
Comics by Scott Snyder